The Fifty-ninth Oklahoma Legislature is the current meeting of the legislative branch of the government of Oklahoma, composed of the Senate and the House of Representatives. It meets in Oklahoma City, Oklahoma from January 3, 2023, to January 3, 2025, during the first two years of the second administration of Governor Kevin Stitt. The 2022 Oklahoma elections maintained Republican control of both the House and Senate.

Dates of sessions
Organizational day: January 3, 2023
First Session: February 6, 2023 - May 26, 2023
Second Session: 

Previous: 58th Legislature • Next: 60th Legislature

Major events
Representative Annie Menz was sworn is as the first Latina member of the Oklahoma House of Representatives.

On January 3, 2023, Representative Cyndi Munson became the first Asian-American nominee for Speaker of the Oklahoma House of Representatives.

Membership

Senate

Overview

Leadership
Senate Leadership

Majority Leadership

Minority Leadership

Committee Leadership

Members

†Elected in a special election

House

Overview

Leadership
House Leadership

Majority Leadership

Minority Leadership

Members

References

External links

Oklahoma legislative sessions
2023 in Oklahoma
Oklahoma
2024 in Oklahoma
Oklahoma